The women's team pursuit race of the 2015–16 ISU Speed Skating World Cup 1, arranged in the Olympic Oval, in Calgary, Alberta, Canada, was held on 14 November 2015.

The Dutch team won the race, while the Japanese team came second, and the Russian team came third.

Results
The race took place on Saturday, 14 November, in the afternoon session, scheduled at 15:07.

Note: NR = national record.

References

Women team pursuit
1